Liptena flavicans, the large ochreous liptena, is a butterfly in the family Lycaenidae. It is found in Liberia, Ivory Coast, Ghana, Nigeria, Cameroon, Gabon, the Republic of the Congo, the Democratic Republic of the Congo, Uganda and Tanzania. The habitat consists of drier forests and open areas in wetter forests.

Subspecies
L. f. flavicans (south-western Cameroon)
L. f. aequatorialis Stempffer, 1956 (Uganda: west to the Bwamba Valley, Democratic Republic of the Congo: Equateur, Tshuapa and Sankuru)
L. f. katera Stempffer, 1956 (Uganda: western shores of Lake Victoria, north-western Tanzania)
L. f. oniens Talbot, 1935 (Liberia, Ivory Coast, Ghana, Nigeria, western Cameroon)
L. f. praeusta Schultze, 1917 (southern Cameroon, Gabon, Congo, Democratic Republic of the Congo: Uele)

References

Butterflies described in 1891
Liptena
Butterflies of Africa